Vartan Makhokhian (31 May 1869 – 10 February 1937) was an Armenian painter who lived in the Ottoman Empire and France and was known for his marine paintings. After completing his studies at the Berlin Academy of Arts, he traveled and exhibited his art in France, Germany, Egypt and elsewhere. His art is displayed in various museums throughout the world.

Life and career
Vartan Makhokhian was born in Trabzon in the Ottoman Empire on 31 May 1869 to Armenian parents. His father, Aristakes Makhokhian, was a merchant who demanded that his two daughters and four sons be educated. In 1875, Makhokhian began his early education at a local Armenian school where he took an interest in drawing. He later attended the prestigious Sanasarian College in Erzurum, returning to Trabzon after five years of study. During his time spent at Sanasarian, Makhokhian learned to paint. He also learned to play the violin and studied music theory. Makhokhian's uncle persuaded him to pursue a career in art. In 1891, Makhokhian began studies at the Berlin Academy of Arts where he was trained under the directorship of Eugen Bracht and Hans Gude.

Makhokhian graduated from the academy in 1894 and traveled to the Crimea, where he met with renowned Russian Armenian painter Ivan Aivazovsky in Feodosia. While in Russia, Makhokhian painted various scenes of the sea. He returned to his native Trabzon in 1895 and witnessed the Hamidian massacres. He escaped first to Batum and then to Europe where he began exhibiting his art. One of his first exhibitions was in Berlin in 1900. In 1904 Makhokhian was accepted into the Berlin Artists' Association. He traveled to Egypt where he exhibited over 150 pieces of his artwork in Alexandria and Cairo. After a brief stop in Denmark, Makhokhian went to Italy, settled in Capri and continued painting there. He returned to Germany in 1907 and participated in various exhibitions Berlin, Düsseldorf, and Munich.

He returned to the Ottoman Empire in 1908 and settled in his hometown of Trabzon. He continued to paint there, but with the start of World War I and the Armenian genocide, Makhokhian moved to Nice, France in 1914, where he remained the rest of his life.
He received French citizenship in 1927, two years after being awarded the Legion of Honor. He participated in the Paris Salon in 1921, 1922, and 1927. In 1931 a personal exhibition was held at the Palais de la Méditerranée in Nice which included 65 of his works. He also exhibited his works in Monte Carlo in 1932.

In 1915, in memory of those who died during the Armenian genocide, Makhokhian composed a symphony entitled The Sobbing of Armenia. It was first performed at Monte Carlo in 1918 and then played throughout Europe.

After a long illness, Makhokhian died on 10 February 1937 in Nice, France at the age of 67.

Exhibitions
Vartan Makhokhian held exhibitions in Cairo, Alexandria (1904), Munich, Düsseldorf, Berlin (1907), Berlin (1907), London (1914), Nice (1918, 1932, 1936), Marseilles (1923), Paris (1925), and Monaco (1932).

Awards
He received the Legion of Honour with the degree of  Chevalier (Knight) in 1925.

Legacy
French art critic Camille Mauclair published a book in 1918 about Makhokhian entitled Le Peintre de la mer Wartan Makhokhian (French: The Painter of the Sea Vartan Makhokhian). In it, Mauclair describes his work as follows:

Makhokhian's art is displayed in museums throughout the world, including the Musée des Beaux-Arts de Nice, Musée Arménien de France, National Gallery of Armenia, and the Pontifical Residence of the Etchmiadzin Cathedral.

Gallery

Monographs
 Ara H. Hakobyan, "Vartan Makhokhian Marine painting", Yerevan, 2004, monograph (in Armenian)
 Ara H. Hakobyan, "Vartan Makhokhian", Yerevan, 2006, album (in Armenian)

See also
Ivan Aivazovsky

References

Emigrants from the Ottoman Empire to France
Armenians from the Ottoman Empire
People from Trabzon
1869 births
1937 deaths
Armenian artists
20th-century painters from the Ottoman Empire
20th-century Armenian painters
French people of Armenian descent
Prussian Academy of Arts alumni
Chevaliers of the Légion d'honneur
Marine artists
Survivors of the Hamidian massacres